Kingswood is an Australian alternative rock group, formed in 2007 in Melbourne, Australia by Fergus Linacre, Alex Laska, Jeremy "Mango" Hunter and Justin Debrincat. The group has released five studio albums to date.

History

2007–2013: Formation and EPs
Kingswood formed in 2007 by Fergus Linacre (lead vocals), Alex Laska (lead guitar), Jeremy "Mango" Hunter (bass) and Justin Debrincat (drums). In 2010, the group released a self-titled EP, limited to 500 copies on CD. Their debut single "Yeah Go Die" was released in February 2011 and received airplay on Triple J. "Medusa" was released in June 2012, followed by "She's My Baby"/"Wolf" in October 2012. "Ohio" was released in April 2013, alongside the deluxe re-release of the EP Change of Heart.

2013–2019: Dew Process
In December 2013, The group announced it had signed with Dew Process and confirmed the release of their debut album for February 2014. Microscopic Wars was recorded at Blackbird Studio, Nashville with three-time Grammy Award-winning producer/sound engineer Vance Powell (Consolers of the Lonely – The Raconteurs, Blunderbuss – Jack White). It debuted at number six on the ARIA Albums Chart in February 2014. At the ARIA Music Awards of 2014, the album was nominated for Best Rock Album In August 2014, the group released "ICFTYDLM" (I Can Feel That You Don't Love Me") to positive reviews.

In 2016, the band spent time in Nashville USA, recording their second album, and in October 2016, released "Creepin'", the album's lead single. Principal songwriter Alex Laska said "Creepin' is a song about the darker and more lustful parts of one's mind, when longing for an object or person of desire. The idea being an attempt at reconciliation of the thought itself when the reality is an insatiable quest that ultimately transforms the protagonist entirely from something quite innocent and pure into a more sinister, powerful self through recognition of this transformation".

In March 2017, Kingswood released their second album After Hours, Close to Dawn, which peaked at number 10 on the ARIA Charts. The album spawned two further singles, "Golden" and "Atmosphere".

In September 2018, the group released the single "Messed It Up", which was described by AIRIT as "all sinewy synth-soul compulsion with a restless rock undertow".

In 2019, "Say You Remember" and "You Make It So Easy" were released as the lead singles from their third studio album, Juveniles, followed by "Bittersweet" in January 2020. Juveniles was released in March 2020 and peaked at number 14 on the ARIA Charts.

2020–present: Kingswood Band
Kingswood's sixth studio album Home was released on 24 February 2023.

Discography

Studio albums

Extended plays

Singles

Awards and nominations

AIR Label Music Awards
The Australian Independent Record Awards (commonly known informally as AIR Awards) is an annual awards night to recognise, promote and celebrate the success of Australia's Independent Music sector.

|-
| AIR Awards of 2013 || Change Of Heart || Best Independent Hard Rock, Heavy or Punk Album|| 
|-

APRA Music Awards
The annual APRA Awards (Australia) are presented by the Australasian Performing Right Association. Kingswood have received three nominations.

|-
| 2015 || "Sucker Punch" || Rock Work of the Year|| 
|-
| 2016 || "Micro Wars" || Rock Work of the Year|| 
|-
| 2018 || "Creepin'" || Rock Work of the Year|| 
|-

ARIA Music Awards
The ARIA Music Awards are a set of annual ceremonies presented by Australian Recording Industry Association (ARIA), which recognise excellence, innovation, and achievement across all genres of the music of Australia. They commenced in 1987.  Kingswood have received one nomination.

! 
|-
| 2014 || Microscopic Wars || Best Rock Album||  || 
|-

J Award
The J Awards are an annual series of Australian music awards that were established by the Australian Broadcasting Corporation's youth-focused radio station Triple J. They commenced in 2005.

|-
| J Awards of 2012
|themselves
| Unearthed Artist of the Year
| 
|-
| J Awards of 2013
| "Ohio"
| Australian Video of the Year
|

References

External links 

Australian rock music groups
Musical groups from Melbourne
Musical groups established in 2007
2007 establishments in Australia
Dew Process artists